Straight to the Heart is the thirteenth studio album by the American country music singer Crystal Gayle. Released in August 1986, it peaked at #12 on the Billboard Country Albums chart.

Two singles from the album, "Cry" and "Straight to the Heart", both reached #1 on the Country Singles Chart in 1986 (the latter of which was Gayle's final #1 hit to date). Further hits were "Nobody Should Have To Love This Way" at #26, and "Only Love Can Save Me Now" at #11. Three songs: "Deep Down", "Lonely Girl” and "Cry" were performed on the daytime drama Another World in 1987.  Crystal also played herself in the storyline involving a serial killer.

Track listing

Personnel
Crystal Gayle - lead vocals
Josh Leo, Steve Gibson, Larry Byrom, Reggie Young, John McFee - guitar
Michael Rhodes, Larry Paxton, Tom Robb - bass
Sonny Garrish - steel guitar
Mike Lawler, David Innis, Vince Melamed - synthesizer
Charles Cochran - synthesizer, piano
James Stroud, Eddie Bayers - drums, percussion
Jim Horn - saxophone
Bruce Dees, Cindy Richardson, Val & Birdie, Dennis Wilson, Diane Tidwell, Lisa Silver, Philip Forrest, Harry Stinson, Larry Lee, John McFee, Keith Knudsen, Tim Goodman - backing vocals
Bergen White - string arrangements
Technical
Eric Prestidge - recording, mixing
Laura LiPuma - art direction, design
Stuart Watson - photography

Chart performance

References
http://www.allmusic.com/album/straight-to-the-heart-mw0000891712

Crystal Gayle albums
1986 albums
Warner Records albums
Albums produced by Jim Ed Norman